Toto the Sheik is a 1950 Italian comedy film directed by Mario Mattoli and starring Totò. It is a parody of desert films such as The Son of the Sheik and Siren of Atlantis.

Plot 
Antonio is the humble servant of a rich family, governed by the Marquis Gastone. Gastone is a young man madly in love with Lulu, but she betrays him, and he desperately enlist in the French Foreign Legion. The old Marchesa, his mother, persuades Antonio to enlist to watch over Gastone, and so he arrives in Arabia.

There Antonio is led with barrel (because enlistment is secret), and is exchanged by Arabs for their sheikh, who came to lead the revolt against the western invaders. The vicissitudes follow one another, especially when the rebels discover that Antonio is not the Sheikh, and so, having also escaped a death sentence, Antonio ends up in a secret passage, in the lost city of Atlantis, where he meets the beautiful Queen Antinea.

Cast
 Totò as Antonio Sapore, il maggiordomo
 Tamara Lees as Antinea, la regina di Atlantide
 Laura Gore as Lulù
 Lauretta De Lauri as Fatma
 Ada Dondini as La marchesa
 Kiki Urbani as La danzatrice araba
 Aroldo Tieri as Il marchese Gastone
 Cesare Polacco as Mohamed
 Arnoldo Foà as Il matto
 Mario Castellani as Il colonnello dei ribelli
 Riccardo Billi as L'arabo della cella bianca
 Ubaldo Lay as Il maggiore della legione
 Carlo Duse as Un beduino
 Carlo Croccolo as Il cameriere
 Ughetto Bertucci as Ludovico, l'autista

References

Bibliography
 Roberto Curti. Italian Gothic Horror Films, 1957-1969. McFarland, 2015.

External links

1950 films
Italian comedy films
1950s Italian-language films
1950 comedy films
Italian black-and-white films
Films based on Atlantida
Films directed by Mario Mattoli
Films set in deserts
Films about the French Foreign Legion
Films with screenplays by Age & Scarpelli
1950s Italian films